= Constituency W-339 =

Provincial constituency of Punjab, Pakistan

W-339
- Woman Reserved constituency for the Provincial Assembly of Punjab

Current constituency

W-339 is a reserved Constituency for female in the Provincial Assembly of Punjab.

== See also ==
- Punjab, Pakistan
